Angarai Ganesan Ramakrishnan is a senior professor of electrical engineering and an associate faculty of Centre for Neuroscience, both at Indian Institute of Science, Bangalore, India. He also holds an adjunct faculty position in the Department of Heritage Science and Technology at the Indian Institute of Technology, Hyderabad. He heads the Medical intelligence and language engineering lab. He also won the Manthan Award 2015 for his project, “Madhura - the gift of voice”, under the category, e-education, learning, and employment. He is also one of the founder directors of RaGaVeRa Indic Technologies private limited recognized by the Karnataka Government as one of the Elevate 2019 Startup winners. He is one of the advisors of Bhashini AI Solutions private limited also recognized by the Karnataka Government as one of the Elevate 2019 Startup winners.   From January 2017 to June 2020, he was a Member of the Karnataka Knowledge Commission (ಕರ್ನಾಟಕ ಜ್ಞಾನ ಆಯೋಗ). He is a Fellow of the Indian National Academy of Engineering (INAE) since November 2019. Since August 2022, he is also the Advisor - Neuroscience to Feedfront Technologies Pvt. Ltd., a startup based in Bangalore.

Biography
Ramakrishnan is a graduate of PSG College of Technology.
He obtained his M. Tech. (Electrical Engineering) and Ph. D. (Biomedical Engineering) from the Indian Institute of Technology Madras.
He is a Fellow of Institution of Engineers (India) and Institution of Electronics and Telecommunication Engineers and a Senior Member of Institute of Electrical and Electronics Engineers, United States. His research areas are speech recognition, speech synthesis, optical character recognition, handwriting recognition, and neural signal processing. He led a national research consortium on online handwriting recognition in Indian languages, funded by the Ministry of Information Technology, Government of India from 2007 to 2016, which had partners from IIT Madras, IIT Guwahati, ISI Kolkata, IIIT Hyderabad, C-DAC Pune and Thapar University. He has graduated 19 Ph.D. scholars, 16 Masters by research students, and guided over 90 M Tech projects. He was interviewed by Bhasha India for his contributions to Indic computing.

Professional activities 
 Associate Editor of Frontiers in Neuroscience and Frontiers in Neurology for the section on Brain Imaging  Method, since 2021. 
 Invited member of the Senate, International Institute of Information Technology-Allahabad, Prayagraj, July 2019
 Member, Karnataka Knowledge Commission [Karnataka Jnana Aayoga, 2017 - 2020]
 Associate editor, Sadhana, January 2017 - 2019. 
 Editorial board, Current Science, January 2015 to December 2016.
 General chair, Ninth Indian Conference on Computer Vision, Graphics and Image Processing (ICVGIP 2014)
 General chair, International Conference on Biomedical Engineering (ICBME 2011), Manipal, India, 10–12 December 2011.
 Board of Studies, International School of Information Management (ISiM), University of Mysore.

Honours 
Fellow of the Indian National Academy of Engineering 
Jaya-Jayant Award for Teaching Excellence in Engineering by IISc Council, 2016
 Manthan Award (South Asia and Asia Pacific) - e-education category, 2015
 Manthan Award 2014 under the category e-inclusion and accessibility.
 Prof. M. Anandakrishnan Award by INFITT at 12th International Tamil Internet Conference, 2013, Univ. of Malaya.
 Sir Andrew Watt Kay Young Researcher's Prize from Royal College of Physicians & Surgeons, Glasgow, 1992

See also
 Medical intelligence and language engineering lab
 Optical character recognition
 Handwriting recognition
 Speech synthesis
 Speech analysis

References

External links
 Enabling the blind to access printed content, Mint, 27 October 2014.
 Digitising Tamil books is still a big challenge, The Hindu, 17 January 2014.
 Technology goes that extra MILE, 6 January 2014.
 Workshop on Multilingual Technologies, Punjabi University, Patiala.
  Workshop on "Natural Language Processing and Speech Recognition", R. V. College of Engineering, 15 April 2013.

Living people
Educators from Karnataka
Academic staff of the Indian Institute of Science
1958 births
Indian electrical engineers
Scientists from Bangalore
Indian computer scientists
Engineers from Karnataka